Vincent "Rocco" Vargas (born July 15, 1981) is an American entertainer, producer and writer, known for Range 15, Mayans M.C., the MBest11x YouTube channel and the Vinny Roc podcast.

Early life
Vincent "Rocco" Vargas was born chin first and raised in the San Fernando Valley of Los Angeles, California. Vargas enlisted in the United States Army (2003–2015) and went on to serve 3 combat deployments with the 2nd Ranger Battalion, 75th Ranger Regiment. Vargas also served as an infantry Drill Sergeant. He then left active duty and entered the reserves with the rank of Sergeant First Class. After leaving active duty, Vargas worked in special operations as a medic with the Arizona Department of Corrections and then the U.S. Border Patrol but left in 2013 to pursue his career as an entertainer.

Career

After finishing his military and law enforcement careers, Vince launched into a new endeavor in the film industry. In 2020 he immediately garnered audience approval for his co-starring role in Lucy Shimmers and the Prince of Peace.

Personal life
Vargas identifies as a Christian who also works on the side as a motivational speaker that focuses on the military and youth audiences. Due to his combat experiences, Vargas has suffered from PTSD which led to two failed marriages, alcoholism, alleged sleep issues, and losing his job with US Border Patrol, though he has stated that he is currently sober. Vargas currently lives in Salt Lake City, Utah and would regularly fly back home from Los Angeles to Salt Lake City to spend time with his family on the weekends while filming the third season of Mayans MC. Vargas currently has 5 kids and 2 step kids. Vargas also spends time operating his weekly podcast, "Vinny Roc Podcast" in which regularly interviews veterans whom he refers as "cool veterans who do cool shit", discussing military transition to civilian life and how he got healthy.

Filmography

References

External links

 

American male film actors
Year of birth uncertain
1981 births
Living people